Almont is an unincorporated community in Clinton County, in the U.S. state of Iowa.

History
A post office was established as Almont Station in 1871, renamed Almont in 1883, and was discontinued in 1934. The community was named for the Mexican general Juan Almonte. Almost's population was 50 in 1925.

References

Unincorporated communities in Clinton County, Iowa
1871 establishments in Iowa
Populated places established in 1871
Unincorporated communities in Iowa